Premka is a village in the municipality of Kičevo, North Macedonia. It used to be part of the former municipality of Oslomej.

Demographics
According to the 2002 census, the village had a total of 134 inhabitants. Ethnic groups in the village include:

Albanians 108
Macedonians 25
Others 1

References

External links

Villages in Kičevo Municipality
Albanian communities in North Macedonia